Peter Tillemans ( 1684 – 5 December 1734) was a Flemish  painter, best known for his works on sporting and topographical subjects. Alongside John Wootton and James Seymour, he was one of the founders of the English school of sporting painting.

From 1708 until his death he lived and worked in England.

Life

Tillemans was born in Antwerp in  1684, the son of a diamond-cutter, and studied painting there under various masters. As he was the brother-in-law of another Flemish painter, Pieter Casteels, it is assumed that he married before leaving Antwerp. Like other artists from the Low Countries such as Dirk Maas, Jan Wyck and Willem van de Velde the Younger, Tillemans moved to England. In Tillemans's case he moved in 1708, induced to do so by a picture-dealer called Turner: he spent the rest of his life working there.

In his Sportsmen in a Landscape (1971), Aubrey Noakes offers this description of Tillemans: 

A chronic sufferer of asthma, Tillemans retired to Richmond "on account of his ill state of health".  He died at the house of Dr Cox Macro (1683–1767, later chaplain to George II) in Little Haugh Hall, in Suffolk, on 5 December 1734 (the previous day he "had been busy on a horse portrait") and was buried on 7 December at Stowlangtoft. His collection of paintings had been sold in an auction conducted by Dr Macro on 19 and 20 April 1733 and included paintings by James Tillemans, probably a son or other relation, and by Arthur Devis, who, like Joseph Francis Nollekens, was one of Tillemans's pupils. Dr Macro had a bust of Tillemans made by John Michael Rysbrack, placing it "in a niche at the top of a staircase in Little Haugh Hall". A portrait of the artist, engraved by T. Chambers, from a painting by Hissings, is given in Fuseli's 1805 revised edition of Rev. Matthew Pilkington's A Dictionary of Painters.

Painting

Early works
Tillemans was brought to England in 1708 by "Turner, a picture dealer"; his first works were copies of battle scenes made for Turner, particularly of the works of Jacques Courtois, as well as small genre pictures. He enjoyed much success imitating the style and execution of David Teniers.

Tillemans worked in many different styles and rarely dated his work. After at first working as a copyist, he quickly made his name, and among his first important commissions in England were two paintings of the interior of the Palace of Westminster, one of Queen Anne in the House of Lords (1708–14), the other of the House of Commons in session (c. 1710). By 1711 Tillemans joined Godfrey Kneller's Academy of Painting and Drawing in Great Queen Street, London, stating his speciality as "landskip".

His main residence was in Westminster but he travelled extensively on commission. Dr Cox Macro, his most faithful patron and the one for whom his work is best documented, gave him commissions, including battle and hunting scenes, landscapes, renovation work, and portraits from 1715. In 1716 Tillemans repainted part of a portrait of Dr Macro by Frans van Mieris from around 1703, making alterations to his face. That year he also painted Dr Macro in the background of The Artist's Studio (c. 1716),  a self-portrait, with a pupil and Dr Cox Macro, surrounded in the studio by paintings. (He also painted Dr Macro's children in Master Edward and Miss Mary Macro in c. 1733). In 1717, his conversation piece of the royal family making music was shown at the Bartholomew fair. He was commissioned in 1719 by the antiquary John Bridges to "make about 500 drawings for a projected history of Northamptonshire", and some of these were later published in Peter Whalley's History and Antiquities of the County of Northamptonshire (1791). His other patrons included the Duke of Devonshire, the 4th Baron Byron (to whom he was also drawing instructor), and the Duke of Kingston.

His "highly accurate" eponymous painting of the Battle of Glen Shiel in the Scottish National Portrait Gallery, painted in the same year as the battle, was originally catalogued as The Battle of Killiecrankie 1689.

Sporting and topographical works
The greater part of Tillemans's oeuvre was painted from approximately 1720 onwards, and it is from the works painted over these years that he chiefly derives his fame. During the early 1720s, Tillemans moved successfully into the field of painting dogs, horses and racing scenes and was one of the earliest painters of sporting scenes in England; four of these works, "engraved by Claude du Bosc and published in 1723, are among the most spectacular early sporting prints in England". 

The development of painting on sporting themes was centred on the Newmarket Racecourse in the market town of Newmarket in Suffolk. Together with his friend John Wootton (a pupil of Jan Wyck) and James Seymour, Tillemans was one of the three founders of the English sporting school; their paintings "show the first marriage of the topographical tradition of landscape with a sporting element".  Because both Wootton and Tillemans omitted to sign many of their works, some of them are difficult to tell apart. Tillemans's Newmarket: the Long Course (1723) is in the Government Art Collection. Another Newmarket scene, The Newmarket Watering Course and a sporting scene, Three Hounds with Horsemen, a Hunt to the Left, both in Norwich Castle Museum and Art Gallery, were originally part of John Patteson's collection. Patteson had inherited many of Tillemans's paintings by his marriage into Dr Macro's family, and these now form part of the Patteson Collection at Norwich Castle Museum. Tilleman painted numerous portraits of racehorses for his patrons, among whom were the Dukes of Somerset, Rutland, and Bolton, and the Earl of Portmore.

According to Sir Walter Gilbey in his Animal Painters of England From the Year 1650: A brief history of their lives and works:

In 1724, Tillemans worked with Joseph Goupy on scenery for the Haymarket opera house.

Tillemans was also a member of the Rose and Crown Club, and in 1725 was recorded by George Vertue as steward to the Society of the Virtuosi of St Luke. Vertue noted that Tillemans was acquainted with "people of Fashion & persons of Quality" and was in demand as a painter of country-house and estate views. 

His country house paintings include Chatsworth House (1720s), Holker Hall, and Chirk Castle in Denbighshire (1725). In such work the houses often stand in landscapes brought to life by animals and hunting scenes.

Tillemans painted several topographical works of views in Richmond and Twickenham, to the west of London, including A View of Richmond from Twickenham Park (later engraved by P. Benazech), A View from Richmond Hill and The Thames at Twickenham (known also as A Prospect of Twickenham). This last painting, the "earliest complete topographical view of the river frontage in the 18th century", was commissioned either by the poet Alexander Pope (his villa by the Thames is shown in the painting) or John Robartes, later 4th Earl of Radnor. His panorama of The Thames from Richmond Hill (c. 1723) was one of three paintings done for the Earl of Radnor.

Known works

Anne Reade, Mrs Myddelton, Chirk Castle
The Artist's Studio, c. 1716, Norwich Castle Museum and Art Gallery
The Battle of Belgrade, Chirk Castle
The Battle of Glenshiel 1719, 1719, Scottish National Portrait Gallery
Battle Scene, Norwich Castle Museum and Art Gallery
Bird's eye view of Clevedon Court, Clevedon Court
Castor Church South View (drawing) c. 1719
Charge de cavalerie
Chester and the Roodee, Grosvenor Museum, Chester
Chirk Castle from the North, National Museum Cardiff
Dead game, Audley End House
The Duke of Kent's Family, Tate Britain
Figures in a landscape, Harris Museum
Four Hounds with Gentlemen Shooting, Norwich Castle Museum and Art Gallery
Four Hounds with Huntsmen to the Right, Norwich Castle Museum and Art Gallery
Foxhunting in Wooded Country, c. 1720–30, Tate Britain
Harrow School and church, Harrow School (Old Speech Room Gallery)
Horse with Groom and Hounds, Norwich Castle Museum and Art Gallery
Hunting Piece: Going a Hunting with Lord Biron's Pack of Hounds, Norwich Castle Museum and Art Gallery
Ideal Landscape. Verso: Landscape Composition with Travellers, Gibbets and Wheels in the Distance, 1728, Tate Britain
Interior of the House of Commons in Session, c. 1710, Palace of Westminster Collection
Isola Bella, Lago Maggiore, Belton House
Landscape with castle on a hill, Courtauld Institute of Art Gallery
Little Haugh Hall, Suffolk, Norwich Castle Museum and Art Gallery
Llangollen and the Dee Bridge, Chirk Castle
London from Greenwich Park, Bank of England
Mary Lidell, Mrs Mydellton, Chirk Castle
Mary Lidell, Mrs Mydellton and her son Richard, Chirk Castle
New Hall, Bodenham, Salisbury and South Wiltshire Museum
Newstead Abbey from the West, Newstead Abbey
Newmarket: the Long Course, 1723, Government Art Collection
The Newmarket Watering Course, Norwich Castle Museum and Art Gallery
A nobleman out shooting over his pointers in his park, Inland Revenue
The Noblemen's and Gentlemen's Several Strings or Trains of Running Horses, taking their Exercise up the Watering Course on the Warren Hill at Newmarket (engraving and etching), Government Art Collection
Park Landscape (watercolour (brown), pen and ink (brown) on paper), Courtauld Institute of Art Gallery
Le passage du gué (grey and black wash, ink and white heightenings), c. 1720
Portrait of Master Edward and Miss Mary Macro, the children of Revd Dr Cox Macro, c. 1733, Norwich Castle Museum and Art Gallery
Portrait of a Nobleman on Horseback, a Palace and Gardens Beyond
Prospect Of Ashburnham Place Sussex
A Prospect of the Town of Stanford, from Parsons Cross (coloured engraving), 1719, Government Art Collection
Queen Anne in the House of Lords, c. 1708–14, Royal Collection
The Round Course or Plate Course, with diverse Jockeys and Horses in Different Actions and Postures, going to Start for the King's Plate at Newmarket (engraving and etching), Government Art Collection
The Royal Hospital from the South Bank of The River Thames, Royal Hospital Chelsea
The South Garden at Wrest Park, the Seat in the Duchess's Square, c. 1729–30
Spruce and bell, Newstead Abbey
The Thames at Twickenham, c. 1725
Three Hounds with Sportsman, a Hunt to the Left, Norwich Castle Museum and Art Gallery
Two racehorses with grooms and hounds in the grounds of Newstead Abbey, Newstead Abbey
A view of Chatsworth House and Park with horses and figures, Inland Revenue
View on the Downs near Uppark, Uppark, West Sussex
A View of the Garden and House at Upper Winchendon, Buckinghamshire, Buckinghamshire County Museum
The View of a Horse Match over the Long Course at New Market
View of Leicester from the South, Government Art Collection, Marlborough House
View of Newmarket Heath, Government Art Collection
A View of Richmond from Twickenham Park, 1720s, Orleans House Gallery
A View from Richmond Hill
View of the Thames from Richmond Hill, 1720–3, Government Art Collection
View of a Town, Fitzwilliam Museum
View of Uppark from the South-west, Uppark, West Sussex
The Warren Hill at New Market
Windsor, Anglesey Abbey
Young Squire on Horseback With Dog at Heel

Bibliography
Robert Raines, "Peter Tillemans, Life and Work, with a List of Representative Paintings", Journal of the Walpole Society, vol. XLVII, 1980, pp. 21–59
Bruce A. Bailey (ed.), "Northamptonshire in the Early Eighteenth Century: the Drawings of Peter Tillemans and Others", The Publications of the Northamptonshire Record Society, vol. XXXIX, 1994/1996

References

External links
 
 Taken from the road: Peter Tillemans in Northamptonshire

1684 births
1734 deaths
Equine artists
Flemish portrait painters
Flemish landscape painters
Landscape artists
Military art
Artists from Antwerp
Spanish Netherlands emigrants to England
18th-century Flemish painters